Gunniopsis papillata, commonly known as the twin-leaved pigface, is a species of succulent plant in the iceplant family, Aizoaceae and is endemic to inland areas of Australia. It is an annual herb with pimply, spatula-shaped to egg-shaped leaves and flowers with white or yellow petals.

Description
The branchlets and leaves are usually covered with pimply or nipple-like projections. There are many stamens arranged in two or three whorls. Flowering occurs from August to October.

Taxonomy
Gunniopsis papillata was first formally described in 1983 by Robert Chinnock from specimens collected near Curdamurka (west of Lake Eyre) by Joseph Zvonko Weber in 1978.

Distribution and habitat
Twin-leaved pigface is found long ephemeral creek beds, swales and in depressions on gibber flats in saline areas, mainly through central and northern parts of South Australia where it grows in loam or clay soils. It also occurs in the south west of Queensland, north-western inland New South Wales, and there are also old records from the south of the Northern Territory where the species is listed as "near threatened" under the Territory Parks and Wildlife Conservation Act.

References

papillata
Flora of South Australia
Flora of Queensland
Flora of New South Wales
Flora of the Northern Territory
Plants described in 1983